This article refers to the Sports broadcasting contracts in Poland. For a list of other country's broadcasting rights, see Sports television broadcast contracts.

Fight Sports 
Bushido MMA: DAZN: October 2022 to October 2025, all fights
CAGE MMA Finland: Viaplay
Dream Boxing: DAZN: October 2022 to October 2025, all fights
Golden Boy: DAZN
King of Kings: DAZN: October 2022 to October 2025, all fights
KSW: Viaplay
Matchroom: DAZN

Football 
FIFA World Cup: TVP
UEFA European Championship: TVP
UEFA Champions League: TVP
Premier League: Viaplay
La Liga: Canal+ Premium and Eleven Sports

Motor racing
Formula One: Viaplay

References

Poland
Television in Poland